Morrisville may refer to:

 Morrisville, Bucks County, Pennsylvania, United States
 Morrisville, Greene County, Pennsylvania, United States
 Morrisville, Missouri, United States
 Morrisville, New York, United States
 Morrisville, Newfoundland and Labrador, Canada
 Morrisville, North Carolina, United States
 Morrisville, Ohio
 Morrisville, Vermont, United States
 Morrisville, Virginia, United States